The Water and Sewerage Authority of Trinidad and Tobago (WASA) is the sole water and sewerage provider in Trinidad and Tobago. It was formed in 1965 by an Act of Parliament to manage the Hollis, Caroni–Arena and Navet dams in Trinidad. In Tobago, WASA maintains the Hillsborough Reservoir along with other freshwater wells to provide municipal drinking water for the country. The purview of the authority extends to the country's sewage treatment plants.

History

The Water and Sewerage Authority was formed by Act 16 of 1965 and enacted on September 1, 1965. This Act brought together several agencies that were formerly charged with the responsibility of providing water and sewerage facilities to the nation:

 The Central Water Distribution Authority
 The Port of Spain City Council
 The San Fernando Borough Council
 The Arima Borough Council
 The County Councils
 The Water Division of the Ministry of Public Utilities
 The Sanitation Division of the Ministry of Public Utilities

Infrastructure

The authority is the largest public utility in the country. It serves over 92% of the population with pipeborne water through private house connections and standpipes. Since its establishment, water production has increased from 223,000 cubic metres to 650,000 cubic metres in 1990.

With respect to wastewater, 30%–40% of the population is served by a central sewerage collection and treatment system. Another 40% of the population are served by cesspit-tank soil-absorption field systems. Those remaining are served by pit latrines (outhouses).

Sport

The authority is represented by WASA FC, currently playing in the National Super League, the second tier of the Trinidadian and Tobagonian football league structure.

See also
 Trinidad and Tobago Electricity Commission

References 

Government agencies of Trinidad and Tobago
Water management authorities